Kylemore may refer to:
 Kylemore, Saskatchewan, in Canada
 Kylemore, Western Cape in South Africa
 Kylemore Abbey, a Benedictine monastery on the grounds of Kylemore Castle, in Connemara, County Galway, Ireland
 Kylemore College, a secondary school in Ballyfermot, Dublin, Ireland